McInroy is a surname. Notable people with the surname include:

Albert McInroy (1901–1985), English footballer
Ian McInroy (born 1979), Scottish rugby union player

See also
McInroy Collection, a stamp collection of the British Library Philatelic Collections
McInroy's Point, a peninsula in western Scotland